Come Go with Us is the debut album by R&B band Pockets released in 1977 by Columbia Records. The album reached No. 17 on the Billboard Top Soul Albums chart.

Overview
Th track, "Come Go with Me" peaked at No. 17 on the Billboard Hot R&B Singles chart and No. 32 on the Disco chart.

Track listing

Personnel
Jacob Sheffer - guitar, percussion, vocals
Gary Grainger - bass
Al McKinney - keyboards, vocals
George Gray - drums, percussion, vocals
Larry Jacobs - percussion, vocals
Kevin Barnes - trombone, percussion, vocals
Irving Madison - saxophone, percussion, vocals
Charles Williams - trumpet, percussion, vocals

Additional players on select tracks
Andrew Smith Jr., Gary Grant, Steve Madaio - trumpet
George Bohanon, Louis Satterfield - trombone
Assa Drori, Rosemary McLean - cello
Arnold Belnick, Charles Veal Jr., Dorothy Wade, Israel Baker, Janice Gower - violin
Denyse Buffum, Kenneth Yerke, Paul Polivnick, Rollice Dale - viola
Don Myrick - woodwind
Tom Tom 84 (Thomas Washington) - arrangements

References

1977 debut albums
Warner Records albums